Anshuman Nandi (Bengali Pronunciation:-Anshuman Nondi)  is a young 9 years old drummer and child actor from the hills of Tripura. He was 3 years old when he performed in India's Got Talent. He has also made his Bollywood debut as a child actor in 2017 Bollywood film Hindi Medium alongside Irrfan Khan.

Nandi won the National Award in music when he was only 3 years.

References 

Year of birth missing (living people)
Living people
People from Tripura